Berik Beknazarov is a Kazakhstani handball coach of the Kazakhstani national team.

He coached the Kazakhstani team at the 2019 World Women's Handball Championship.

References

1957 births
Living people
Handball coaches of international teams
Place of birth missing (living people)
Date of birth missing (living people)